Phambray Rajgan is a village in the Rawalpindi district near the city of Gujar Khan. Its population is nearly 1000.

Populated places in Rawalpindi District